Lim Bo Seng (27 April 1909 – 29 June 1944) was a Chinese-born resistance fighter based in Singapore and Malaya during World War II. Prior to the outbreak of World War II, he was a prominent businessman among the Chinese community in Singapore. When the Sino-Japanese War broke out, he participated in anti-Japanese activities in Singapore and then at Malaya. 

During the Japanese occupation of the region, he was tasked by the British to establish Force 136, a guerrilla task force backed by the Special Operations Executive (SOE). However, he was captured by Japanese forces in 1944 and died while interned. He is remembered as a war hero in contemporary Singapore and is buried at the MacRitchie Reservoir Park. His grandson, Lim Teck Yin, continued his military legacy by achieving the rank of brigadier general in the Singapore Army.

Family background and early life
Lim was born in Meilin Town, Nan'an County, Fujian Province. his father, Lim Loh, was a building constructor who had six wives, nineteen sons (the first ten of whom were adopted) and nine daughters. Lim was the eleventh son. 
In 1930, Lim married Gan Choo Neo, a Nyonya woman from the Lim clan association in Singapore. They had eight children; one died in infancy. Initially a Taoist, Lim converted to Christianity after marrying Gan.

As a businessman
Lim inherited his father's business in 1929 after his father died. He started running two businesses in brick manufacturing and biscuit production before venturing into the construction industry with his brothers. Apart from running his businesses, Lim was also very active in the Chinese community in Singapore. He was nominated for and held several key positions in the community, including Chairman of the Singapore Building Industry Association, Board Member of the Singapore Chinese Chamber of Commerce and Industry, and Executive Member and Education Director of the Singapore Hokkien Association.

Anti-Japanese activism
When the WW2 broke out in 1937, Lim and other Chinese in Singapore participated in anti-Japanese activities, such as the boycotting of Japanese goods and fund-raising to support ethnic Chinese refugees fleeing to west China and support the war effort in China.

Towards the end of 1937, hundreds of overseas Chinese working in Japanese-owned industries in Malaya went on strike. At the time, the Japanese government owned an iron mine in Bukit Besi near Dungun, Terengganu where about 3,000 workers were employed. The iron ore was shipped to Japan and used as raw material to manufacture weapons. Lim believed that if the workers in the Dungun mine went on strike, the Japanese would suffer a huge loss, so he planned to make the workers go on strike. Around February 1938, Lim travelled to Dungun with Zhuang Huiquan of the Anxi clan association to carry out their plan. Zhuang went to the mine to persuade the workers to go on strike while Lim contacted the local police and gained their support. By early March, Lim and Zhuang achieved success as many workers left the mine and followed them to Singapore. On 11 March 1938, Lim and the Singaporean Chinese community held a welcoming ceremony for the workers, who later resettled and found employment in Singapore.

In December 1941, Lim was put in charge of organising a group of volunteers (part of the Straits Settlements Volunteer Force) to resist the Japanese, who were advancing towards Southeast Asia. The volunteers put up a fierce fight against the Japanese during the Battle of Singapore in February 1942.

Life in Force 136

On 11 February 1942, Lim left Singapore and travelled to Sumatra with other ethnic Chinese leaders to the British Raj India later. He recruited and trained hundreds of secret agents through intensive military intelligence missions from China and the British ruled India. He set up the Sino-British guerrilla task force Force 136 in 1942 with Captain John Davis of the Special Operations Executive (SOE).

Operation Gustavus

Operation Gustavus was aimed at establishing an espionage network in Malaya and Singapore to gather intelligence about Japanese activities, and thereby aid the British in Operation Zipper – the code name for their plan to take back Singapore from the Japanese.

On 24 May 1943, the first group of Force 136 agents, codenamed Gustavus I and led by John Davis, arrived in Perak on board the Dutch submarine O 24. The O 24 would rendezvous with Gustavus I again in September and November 1943 to transfer supplies and personnel from Gustavus IV and V respectively. Its sister ship, the O 23, under Captain Richard Broome, transported Gustavus II and Gustavus III to Malaya on 25 June and 4 August 1943 respectively. Lim arrived in Malaya on 2 November 1943 as part of Gustavus V. He travelled under the alias "Tan Choon Lim" to avoid identification and claimed to be a businessman when he passed through checkpoints.

In Perak, Davis and Lim re-established contact with Major Freddie Chapman, who was part of a British unit that stayed behind after the Malayan Campaign and had been carrying out small-scale attacks against the Japanese in Malaya. They also met guerrilla fighters of the Malayan People's Anti-Japanese Army (MPAJA), including the Malayan communists Chin Peng and Lai Teck. They reached an agreement that the resistance group would be placed under British command in exchange for weapons, supplies and training. One of the Chinese provision shops in Ipoh, Jian Yik Jan, was used as an Allied espionage base. Communication between the agents was done through smuggling messages in empty toothpaste tubes, salted fish and diaries.

Operation Gustavus failed before the agents managed to achieve any results. A communist guerrilla who was captured by the Japanese in January 1944 revealed the existence of the Allied spy network operating on Pangkor Island. In response, the Japanese launched a full-scale counter-espionage operation on the island. By late March 1944, more than 200 soldiers were on the island. On 24 March, the Kempeitai arrested a fisherman, Chua Koon Eng, at Teluk Murrek on the Perak coast. Chua was working on Pangkor Island when Li Han-kwong of Force 136 approached him and requested to use his boat for their communications. Chua confessed and implicated Li in the spy ring. The Japanese laid a trap for Li (who had already escaped Pangkor by then) and, using Chua as bait, captured him shortly after. Under duress, Li confirmed Chua's story but managed to avoid adding anything the Japanese already knew. The Kempeitai took Li to Ipoh in the hope that he would reveal more information. However, Li managed to escape on 26 March 1944 into the jungle. The Kempeitai went on an all-out search for Li and other Force 136 members, eventually leading to Lim's capture. The entire spy network was destroyed by 31 March 1944 and was not reestablished until February 1945.

Capture and death

Lim was captured by the Kempeitai under Major Ōnishi Satoru at a roadblock in Gopeng, Perak around March or April 1944, and taken to the Kempeitai headquarters for interrogation. He refused to provide the Japanese with any information about Force 136 despite being subjected to torture, and protested against the ill treatment of his comrades in prison. He fell ill with dysentery and was bedridden by the end of May 1944. Lim died in the early hours of 29 June 1944 at the age of 35, and was buried behind the Batu Gajah prison compound in an unmarked spot. After the Japanese surrender, Gan Choo Neo was informed of her husband's death by the priest of St. Andrew's School. She went to Batu Gajah with her eldest son to bring her husband's remains home.

Lim's remains arrived at the Tanjong Pagar railway station in Singapore on 7 December 1945. Upon arrival, the hearse was sent off by a large procession of British officers and prominent businessmen from the station to Hock Ann Biscuit Factory in Upper Serangoon Road via Armenian Street. On the same day, a memorial service for Lim was held at the Tong Teh Library of the Kuomintang Association in Singapore.

A funeral service was held on 13 January 1946 at City Hall. Lim's remains was transported in a coffin to a hill in MacRitchie Reservoir (coordinates: 1°20'31.76"N 103°49'50.60"E) for burial with full military honours. Lim was posthumously awarded the rank of Major-General by the Nationalist government of the Republic of China.

The Lim Bo Seng Memorial was unveiled at the Esplanade on 29 June 1954, the 10th anniversary of his death. There are also places named after Lim, such as Bo Seng Avenue in Thomson, Singapore, and Jalan Lim Bo Seng in Ipoh, Malaysia.

Children and descendants
Lim Bo Seng and Gan Choo Neo had four sons and four daughters, one of whom died in infancy. Gan died from cancer on 25 September 1979 at the age of 71. Their sons were Lim Leong Geok, Lim Chin Geok, Lim Whye Geok and Lim Lam Geok. Their daughters were Leow Oon Geok (née Lim), Lim Leng Geok (died in infancy), Yeo Ai Geok (née Lim) and Ooi Siew Geok (née Lim).

Among Lim's children, his eldest son Lim Leong Geok (1932–2004) was an Executive Director of the SMRT Corporation and a key figure in the development of the Mass Rapid Transit (MRT) and Singapore's public transport system. He was posthumously awarded the Distinguished Contribution award by the Land Transport Authority on 31 March 2010.

One of Lim's grandsons, Lim Teck Yin, is a former Brigadier-General in the Singapore Armed Forces and the current Chief Executive Officer of Sport Singapore.

In academia and popular culture
Around the 1990s, Asiapac Books published a comic book based on Lim's life. It was written by Clara Show and illustrated by Chu Yi Min.

In 1997, Singapore's Chinese-language television channel, TCS Channel 8, aired a television series, The Price of Peace, about the Japanese occupation of Singapore. Singaporean actor Rayson Tan portrayed Lim as a semi-fictional protagonist in the drama. In 1999, the English-language channel TCS Channel Five aired an English-dubbed version of The Price of Peace.

Bibliography

Further reading
 Chapman, F. Spencer (1949), The Jungle Is Neutral, Chatto and Windus. Subsequently, published in 1977 by Triad/Mayflower Books and in 2003 by The Lyons Press.
 Poh, Guan Huat (1972), Lim Bo Seng: Nanyang Chinese Patriot, Honours thesis submitted to the History Department, University of Singapore.
 Tan, Chong Tee (2001), Force 136: Story of a World War II Resistance Fighter (second edition), by Asiapac Books.
 Victoria School (2003), "Lim Bo Seng Memorial".

External links
Family interview in 2004

1909 births
1944 deaths
Alumni of St. John's Hall, University of Hong Kong
People from British Singapore
Converts to Christianity
Chinese emigrants to Singapore
Singaporean people of Hokkien descent
Singaporean people of World War II
Raffles Institution alumni
World War II resistance members
Military history of Malaya during World War II